Cape Herdman is a broad ice-covered cape forming the southern entrance point to Violante Inlet, on the Black Coast of Palmer Land, Antarctica. The cape was photographed from the air in 1940 by the United States Antarctic Service; it was rephotographed from the air in 1947 by the Ronne Antarctic Research Expedition and, in conjunction with the Falkland Islands Dependencies Survey surveyed from the ground. It was named by the UK Antarctic Place-Names Committee after Henry F.P. Herdman (1901–67), a British oceanographer who was a member of the scientific staff of the Discovery Investigations, 1924–49, and was later with the National Institute of Oceanography, 1949–67.

References

Headlands of Palmer Land